Niveria liltvedi is a species of small sea snail, a marine gastropod mollusk in the family Triviidae, the false cowries or trivias.

Distribution
This marine species occurs off Angola.

References

 Fehse D. (2002) Beiträge zur Kenntnis der Triviidae (Mollusca: Gastropoda) V. Kritische Beurteilung der Genera und Beschreibung einer neuen Art der Gattung Semitrivia Cossmann, 1903. Acta Conchyliorum 6: 3-48.
 Fehse D. (2016). Contributions to the knowledge of the Triviidae, XXXIV. A new species in the genus Niveria Jousseaume, 1884 from Brazil (Mollusca: Gastropoda). Conchylia. 47(3-4): 65-68.

Triviidae
Gastropods described in 1984